Calytrix truncatifolia is a species of plant in the myrtle family Myrtaceae that is endemic to Western Australia.

It usually blooms between June and September producing pink-purple star-shaped flowers.

Found on sand dunes scattered through the Mid West and Gascoyne regions of Western Australia where it grows on red sandy soils.
 
The species was first formally described by the botanist Lyndley Craven in 1987 in the article A taxonomic revision of Calytrix Labill. (Myrtaceae) in the journal Brunonia.

References

Plants described in 1987
truncatifolia
Flora of Western Australia